Omar Alfredo Guerra Castilla (born May 11, 1981) is a Colombian football midfielder.

Club career
Guerra began his professional playing career with Millonarios, scoring a goal on his debut, during the second half of 1999. Beginning in 2005, Guerra played for Aucas, Deportivo Cuenca and Deportivo Quito in Serie A de Ecuador, scoring 31 goals in three seasons.

In 2008, he returned to Millonarios for a brief spell, but has since returned to Ecuador to pay for Técnico Universitario from Ambato.

References

1981 births
Living people
Colombian footballers
Colombian expatriate footballers
Categoría Primera A players
Chilean Primera División players
Ecuadorian Serie A players
Millonarios F.C. players
Deportivo Pereira footballers
S.D. Aucas footballers
C.D. Cuenca footballers
S.D. Quito footballers
C.D. Técnico Universitario footballers
C.D. Universidad Católica del Ecuador footballers
Santiago Morning footballers
C.S.D. Macará footballers
C.D. Olimpia players
Uniautónoma F.C. footballers
Expatriate footballers in Chile
Colombian expatriate sportspeople in Chile
Expatriate footballers in Ecuador
Colombian expatriate sportspeople in Ecuador
Expatriate footballers in Honduras
Association football midfielders
Footballers from Barranquilla